The  McFarlane Bridge  is a road bridge that carries Lawrence Road across the south arm of the Clarence River at Maclean, New South Wales, Australia. The bridge connects the communities of Maclean and Woodford Island.

Description 
The deck of the whole bridge is sawn hardwood. It was designed by Ernest de Burgh and constructed by Mountney and Company between 1904 and 1906.

The central bascule-type lifting span, notable for its cardioid counterweight track, became redundant and it was last opened for shipping in 1962. The bridge was named in honour of John McFarlane, the Member for the Clarence.

The history of the bridge was memorialised in a book The Centenary Of Mcfarlane Bridge Maclean 1906-2006  published by the Maclean District Historical Society.

The bridge is an important link in the area carrying significant road traffic. As a number of components of the bridge require replacement, the major refurbishment work of the bridge was carried out from June 2012 to June 2013.

Engineering heritage award 

The bridge received a Historic Engineering Marker from Engineers Australia as part of its Engineering Heritage Recognition Program.

See also 

 Historic bridges of New South Wales
 List of bridges in Australia

References

External links
 Bridge on the Roads and Maritime Services webpage

Road bridges in New South Wales
1906 establishments in Australia
Bridges completed in 1906
Beam bridges
Bascule bridges
Wooden bridges in Australia
Steel bridges in Australia
Maclean, New South Wales
Recipients of Engineers Australia engineering heritage markers